Almenrausch and Edelweiss is a 1928 German silent drama film directed by Franz Seitz and starring Leo Peukert, Gritta Ley and Walter Slezak.

It was shot at the Emelka Studios in Munich. The film's sets were designed by the art director Kurt Dürnhöfer.

Cast
 Leo Peukert as Der Bühelhofbauer
 Frieda Lehndorf as Die Bühelhofbäuerin
 Walter Slezak as Mentel, beider Sohn
 Gritta Ley as Evi
 Xaver Terofal as Der Ledermüller
 Margarete Kupfer as Die Ledermüllerin
 Charlotte Susa as Kordel
 Fritz Kampers as Der Kriegelhofer Quasi
 Franz Loskarn as Der Jäger
 Harry Frank as Der Grenzer
 Max Heller as Der Kommandant
 Fanny Terofal-Mittermayr as Stasi, Näherin

References

Bibliography

External links

1928 films
1928 comedy films
German comedy films
Films of the Weimar Republic
Films directed by Franz Seitz
German silent feature films
German black-and-white films
German films based on plays
Films based on German novels
Films set in the Alps
Bavaria Film films
Films shot at Bavaria Studios
Silent comedy films
1920s German films
1920s German-language films